Prostanthera florifera, commonly known as Gawler Ranges mintbush, is a species of flowering plant in the family Lamiaceae and is endemic to the Eyre Peninsula in South Australia. It is a small shrub with densely hairy branches, thick, linear to narrow oblong leaves, and pinkish-red flowers that are pale pink with pinkish-red blotches inside the petal tube.

Description
Flowering occurs from August to October.

Taxonomy
Prostanthera florifera was first formally described in 1984 by Barry Conn in the Journal of the Adelaide Botanic Gardens from specimens collected on Miccollo Hill in the Gawler Ranges in the northern Eyre Peninsula in 1979.

Distribution and habitat
Gawler Ranges mintbush grows amongst in rocky places with scattered shrubs in the Eyre Peninsula of South Australia.

References

florifera
Lamiales of Australia
Flora of South Australia
Plants described in 1984
Taxa named by Barry John Conn